John Whitehill may refer to:
 John Whitehill (representative), member of the U.S. House of Representatives from Pennsylvania
 John Whitehill (governor), East India Company officer, twice temporary governor of Madras